Lago Vista High School is a public high school located in the city of Lago Vista, Texas, USA and classified as a 4A school by the UIL.  It is a part of the Lago Vista Independent School District located in western Travis County.  The High School serves all of Lago Vista, Point Venture, as well as portions of nearby Jonestown, Texas. The school district's current UIL Classification is 4A, Division 2.

In 2015, the school was rated "Met Standard" by the Texas Education Agency.

Athletics
The Lago Vista Vikings compete in these sports - 

Baseball, Basketball, Cheer, Cross Country, Football, Golf, Powerlifting, Soccer, Softball, Tennis, Track & Field, and Volleyball

National Titles
Cheer - 
2022(3A)

State Titles
Cheer - 
2019(3A), 2021(3A), 2022(3A)
Girls Cross Country - 
2020(3A)
Boys Golf - 
1987(1A)
Girls Golf - 
1981(1A), 2004(2A)

Theater
One Act Play 
2015(3A)

References

External links
Lago Vista Independent School District

Public high schools in Travis County, Texas